Steven John McLaughlin (born October 2, 1971) is a former American college and professional football player who was a placekicker in the National Football League (NFL) and the Arena Football League.  He played college football for the University of Arizona, earned All-American honors and won the Lou Groza Award.  A third-round choice in the 1995 NFL Draft, he played for the NFL's St. Louis Rams, as well as five different Arena League teams over an 11-year career.

Early years
McLaughlin was born in Tucson, Arizona. After playing soccer growing up, he attended Sahuaro High School in Tucson, and played for the Sahuaro Cougars high school football team.

College career
While attending the University of Arizona, McLaughlin played for the Arizona Wildcats football team from 1990 to 1994.  As a senior in 1994, he won the Lou Groza Award awarded annually to the outstanding college placekicker in America.  He was also recognized as All-Pac-10 and consensus first-team All-American.

Professional career
The St. Louis Rams selected McLaughlin in the third round (82nd pick overall), and he played for the Rams for a single season in 1995. He appeared in eight games, attempted 16 field goals and completed eight of them; His first official FG was a 27 yarder against the Green Bay Packers at Lambeau field in the 4th Quarter. The Rams won the game 17–14. He also made a field goal late in the 4th quarter as the Rams went on to beat the Chicago Bears 27–24 in their first meeting that year. He was a perfect 17-of-17 on points after touchdowns. He was signed by the Atlanta Falcons in 1996 and the Baltimore Ravens in (NFL Year|1997).

McLaughlin subsequently played for 8 seasons in the AFL with 5 different Arena Football League teams: the Nashville Kats from 1998 to 2001; Buffalo Destroyers in 2002; the Georgia Force from 2003 to 2005; the Orlando Predators in 2005; and the Arizona Rattlers in 2005.  He played in two Arena Bowls with the Nashville Kats and was named 2nd Team All-Arena in 2002 with the Buffalo Destroyers.

Band
McLaughlin formed a band in college named "Pet The Fish" opening for acts such as Weezer and Dave Mathews Band.  The band broke Up shortly before his NFL and AFL career however in 2010 released a solo album under the band name "Steve McLaughlin" titled "No More Record Stores." It was mixed by legendary producer Clif Norrell at Casa Zuma Studios in Malibu, CA.  One of the tracks circulated on a Right Choice Ford commercial appearing in spots on TV and cinema in the US and Mexico.

References

1971 births
Living people
All-American college football players
American football placekickers
Arizona Wildcats football players
Players of American football from Tucson, Arizona
St. Louis Rams players
Portland Forest Dragons players
Nashville Kats players
Buffalo Destroyers players
Georgia Force players
Orlando Predators players
Arizona Rattlers players